Fourmile Creek is a stream in the U.S. state of Kansas. It is a tributary to the Neosho River.

Fourmile Creek was so named on account of its distance,  miles from Council Grove.

References

Rivers of Kansas
Rivers of Morris County, Kansas